Ligia pallasii, the rock louse, is a species of rock slater in the family Ligiidae. It is found in North America.

References

External links

 

Isopoda
Articles created by Qbugbot
Crustaceans described in 1833